Megacyllene caryae, also known as the hickory borer or painted hickory borer, is a species of beetle in the family Cerambycidae occurring in the eastern United States. It was described by Gahan in 1908.
Also found in Hiva Oa, Marquesas islands, French Polynesia

References

Megacyllene
Beetles described in 1908